{{Infobox artist
| name             = Momtaza Mehri
| caption          = Mehri in 2019
| nationality      = Somali-British
| awards           = Out-Spoken Page Poetry Prize
| notable_works    = Doing the Most with the Least| style            = Poet

}}Momtaza Mehri''' is a Somali-British poet and essayist.
In 2017, she received the Outspoken Page Poetry Prize (2017) and in 2018, was named the Young People’s Laureate of London.

 Biography 
Momtaza Mehri grew up in the Middle East. She is currently based in Kilburn, north-west London, where, aside from her progressing poetry career, she is both a volunteer and a trainee biomedical scientist. She began writing poetry for publication in 2014.

Mehri's career began to gain media attention in 2016–2017 when she was featured in DAZED, BuzzFeed, BBC Radio 4, Poetry Society of America; Mask Magazine, SAND Journal, and Frontier Poetry. This was swiftly followed by her winning the Outspoken Page Poetry Prize (2017) and third prize in the National Poetry Competition (2018). Mehri also edits Diaspora Drama'' and was named the Young People’s Laureate of London in 2018.

References 

1994 births
Living people
Somalian emigrants to the United Kingdom
Writers from London
21st-century British women writers
21st-century British poets
Black British women writers
English people of Somali descent